Assa is a small town in southern Morocco, in the Assa-Zag province of the Guelmim-Oued Noun region, about  south-east of Guelmim and about  south-west of Foum Zguid. It lies in a desert area north of the Jbel Ouarkziz and is part of the Sahrawi-inhabited southern region of Morocco. The Draa River lies to its south, and the N12 highway crosses the town.

In the 2012 census Assa had a population of 18,367, the largest in its province and sixth largest in the region.

References

Populated places in Guelmim-Oued Noun
Articles which contain graphical timelines
Assa, Morocco